Cătălin George Straton (born October 9, 1989) is a Romanian footballer who plays as a goalkeeper for Liga I side FC Argeș Pitești. In the past Straton also played for teams such as: Rapid București, FC Vaslui, CS Universitatea Craiova, ACS Poli Timișoara, Dunărea Călărași, Dinamo București or FCSB .

He joined Dinamo București in 2019. In September 2020, he moved on a free transfer to FCSB.

Career statistics

Club
Statistics accurate as of match played 11 March 2023.

Honours 
ACS Poli Timișoara
Cupa Ligii runner-up: 2016–17
FCSB
 Supercupa României runner-up: 2020

References

External links
 
 

1989 births
Living people
Footballers from Bucharest
Romanian footballers
Romania under-21 international footballers
Association football goalkeepers
Liga I players
FC Rapid București players
FC Vaslui players
CS Universitatea Craiova players
ACS Poli Timișoara players
FC Dunărea Călărași players
FC Dinamo București players
FC Steaua București players
FC Argeș Pitești players